Clench is a surname. Notable people with the surname include:

Andrew Clench (died 1692), English physician
Jim Clench (1949–2010), Canadian musician
John Clench (died 1607), English judge
Nora Clench (1867–1938), Canadian violinist
Ralfe Clench ( – 1828), farmer, judge and political figure in Upper Canada
William J. Clench (1897–1984), American malacologist